The 2015 Shoot Out (officially the 2015 Betway Snooker Shoot Out) was a professional non-ranking snooker tournament that took place between 4–6 March 2015 at the Circus Arena in Blackpool. It was played under a  variation of the standard rules of snooker.

Dominic Dale was the defending champion, but he lost 20–65  against Luca Brecel in round one.

Michael White won his first professional title by defeating Xiao Guodong 1-0 (54–48) in the final.

Prize fund
The breakdown of prize money for this year is shown below:
Winner: £32,000
Runner-up: £16,000
Semi-final: £8,000
Quarter-final: £4,000
Last 16: £2,000
Last 32: £1,000
Last 64: £500
Highest break: £2,000
Total: £130,000

Draw
The draw for round one was made on 12 February 2015 and was broadcast live by Talksport. There were two century breaks during the tournament. Martin Gould made a 116 break in round two, and Shaun Murphy made a 105 break in round three.

Top half

Bottom half

Final

Century breaks 

 116  Martin Gould
 105  Shaun Murphy

References

2015
Snooker Shoot-Out
Snooker Shoot-Out
Sport in Blackpool